The 2023 Halifax Thunderbirds season is the third season in Halifax, Nova Scotia for the National Lacrosse League (NLL) franchise that began play in 2020 after relocating from Rochester, New York, where they operated as the Rochester Knighthawks.  The Thunderbirds opened the 2023 season on December 2, 2022, against the Philadelphia Wings.

Regular season

Final standings

Game log

Roster

Goaltenders

Defenseman
 

 

Forwards

 

 

Transition

Practice

Injured

Head Coach
 Mike Accursi

Assistant Coaches
 Chad Culp
 Jason Johnson
 Roger Chrysler
 Billy Dee Smith

Athletic Performance Coach
 Dan Noble

Equipment Manager
 Dave Sowden

Entry Draft
The 2022 NLL Entry Draft took place on September 10, 2022. The Thunderbirds made the following selections:

References

Halifax Thunderbirds seasons
Halifax Thunderbirds season